Os Experientes is a Brazilian television series created by Quico Meirelles, with screenplay by Antonio Prata and Márcio Alemão and directed by Fernando Meirelles. Was co-produced by O2 Filmes and aired by Rede Globo from April 10 to May 1, 2015, in 4 episodes.

Plot 
Made up of four independent stories interconnected by the characters, the show reminisces about growing old, but also about rediscovering and reinventing ourselves to enjoy the best years of our lives.

Cast 
Beatriz Segall... Yolanda
João Côrtes ... Kléber Amaral dos Santos
João Baldasserini ... Altair Pereira da Silva
André Abujamra ... Nogueira
Augusto Madeira ... Tenente Souza
Bruno Giordano ... Wilson Lopes
Anamaria Barreto ... Mary 
Fábio Nepo ... Cabo Moacir
Wilson das Neves ... Mateus
Germano Mathias ... Lucas Pereira 
Goulart de Andrade ... Oswaldo 
Bibba Chuqui ... Celeste 
Cris Carniato ... Cristiane
Juca de Oliveira ... Napoleão Roberto Junqueira da Costa 
Dan Stulbach ... Luiz Vilela da Costa 
Lima Duarte ... Doutor Pricolli 
Othon Bastos ... Del Bello 
Karin Rodrigues ... Nininha 
Clarisse Abujamra ... Vera Lúcia
Teca Pereira ... Cleuza Silveira Santos (Negra)
Bruno Belarmino ... Ronaldo Damasceno
Selma Egrei ... Francisca Toledini 
Joana Fomm ... Maria Helena 
Eucir de Souza ... Daniel Toledini
Sílvia Lourenço ... Neide Toledini

Awards

References

External links 
 
 Os Experientes at the Internet Movie Database

2015 in Brazilian television
Brazilian television miniseries
2015 Brazilian television series debuts
2015 Brazilian television series endings
Portuguese-language television shows
Rede Globo original programming